Benny Golson Quartet Live is a live album by saxophonist/composer Benny Golson that was recorded in Italy in 1989 and released on the French Dreyfus label.

Reception

The AllMusic review by Dave Nathan said "With live sessions there's a special vitality and excitement that's missing from a studio recording as the players feed off each other and the audience. Not constrained by time limitations or technical barriers, the quartet lets its collective hair down for 67 minutes of intelligent, but somewhat subdued, improvisation ... This is a good, solid quartet recording".

Track listing 
All compositions by Benny Golson except where noted
 "Sweet and Lovely" (Gus Arnheim, Jules LeMare, Harry Tobias) – 13:47
 "Along Came Betty" – 11:47
 "I Remember Clifford" – 12:13
 "The Cup Bearers" (Tom McIntosh) – 16:51
 "Jam the Avenue" – 11:21

Personnel 
Benny Golson – tenor saxophone
Mulgrew Miller – piano
Peter Washington - bass 
Tony Reedus – drums

References 

Benny Golson live albums
1991 live albums
Dreyfus Records live albums